James Wright (born 2 June 1936) is a New Zealand cricketer. He played in three first-class matches for Northern Districts in 1958/59.

See also
 List of Northern Districts representative cricketers

References

External links
 

1936 births
Living people
New Zealand cricketers
Northern Districts cricketers
Cricketers from Queensland